The 15th Guldbagge Awards ceremony, presented by the Swedish Film Institute, honored the best Swedish films of 1978 and 1979, and took place on 24 September 1979. A Respectable Life directed by Stefan Jarl was presented with the award for Best Film.

Awards
 Best Film: A Respectable Life by Stefan Jarl
 Best Director: Stefan Jarl for A Respectable Life
 Best Actor: Anders Åberg for Kejsaren
 Best Actress: Sif Ruud for A Walk in the Sun
 Special Achievement: Keve Hjelm for Godnatt, jord
 The Ingmar Bergman Award: Lars Karlsson

References

External links
Official website
Guldbaggen on Facebook
Guldbaggen on Twitter
15th Guldbagge Awards at Internet Movie Database

1979 in Swedish cinema
1979 film awards
Guldbagge Awards ceremonies
1970s in Stockholm
September 1979 events in Europe